Ivan Matias is an American singer, songwriter, producer, arranger, hip hop ghostwriter, and entrepreneur. He is primarily known for writing and producing hit songs for artists like En Vogue ("Don't Let Go (Love)"), Angie Stone ("Wish I Didn't Miss You"), SWV ("You're The One"), and Blu Cantrell ("Breathe") among others which have sold over 44 million records worldwide and appear on over 100 greatest hits and compilation albums.

Matias has also had four major label recording deals with Atlantic Records, London Records, Arista Records, and Elektra Entertainment. Only his Arista artist album was released and produced a #1 Dance Single "I've Had Enough".
Matias has been featured on several soundtracks including Dr. Dolittle ("Do Little Things"), Set It Off ("Set It Off"), The Mod Squad ("Messin' Around")  and Sprung ("Since You've Gone Away").

Early career 

Ivan began his career as a backing singer & dancer for many artists including Mariah Carey and Busta Rhymes. He went on from these humble beginnings to write and produce songs recorded by many of the industry's leading acts including Lauryn Hill, Jay-Z, Pink, Dr. Dre, Curtis Mayfield, Janet Jackson, Nelly, Lil' Kim, Timbaland, Swizz Beatz, Outkast, Queen Latifah, Toni Braxton, En Vogue, SWV, Angie Stone, Blu Cantrell, Sean Paul, Silk, Az Yet, Traci Spencer, Fatboy Slim, Chico Debarge, Ray J, Changing Faces, Tomcraft, Xscape,The Braxtons, Immature, City High, Another Level, Jody Watley, Eric Sermon and Bette Midler.

Many of his songs have been featured worldwide on MTV, BET, VH1, NBC, FOX, ABC, CBS, BBC, ITV & performed on AMERICAN IDOL, THE X FACTOR (around the world), DANCING WITH THE STARS, THE VOICE, EMMY AWARDS, R&B DIVAS & SO YOU THINK YOU CAN DANCE and many other commercial placements.
Matias was signed to Warner/Chappell Music at the age of 19 making him one of the youngest and longest-running active writers in Warner's history. Matias has also had one of his songs appear on a newly released album for 18 consecutive years since his writing career began in 1995.
His career has included collaboration with top producers and writers including Dr.Dre, Timbaland, Swizz Beatz, Arif Mardin, Diane Warren, Wyclef Jean, Rodney Jerkins, Narada Michael Walden, Mervyn Warren, Just Blaze, Full Force, Frankie Knuckles, Randy Jackson, Rhett Lawrence, CJ Mackintosh and others. Many of Matias' hits were written with longtime songwriting partner Andrea Martin.

Caushun The Gay Rapper 

In 2000, Matias created a parody artist, Caushun, who received attention after he was announced as the first openly gay rapper to be signed to a major record label, including a New York Times cover & features in several publications, documentaries & television networks including Newsweek, Fox News, MTV, BET VH1 and recurring appearances on NY's HOT 97 and WBLS radio stations. Matias negotiated with hip hop mogul Russell Simmons to release an album of the parody rapper. Matias' creation has been credited with building the bridge between the LGBT community and the hip hop community as well as cultivating and drawing attention to the underground LGBT hip hop scene.

Recent News 

In December 2013 Matias' song "Don't Let Go (Love)" soared back to #1 & #3 simultaneously on the iTunes chart after Little Mix performed on The X Factor UK. Australian singer Greg Gould’s version of the track topped the charts globally in 2017 and the music video has had over 20 million views. Matias put Gould in touch with En Vogue’s Maxine Jones and the two re-recorded Gould’s arrangement of the song as a duet and then embarked on a tour together in late 2017.

References 

Year of birth missing (living people)
Living people
20th-century American businesspeople
21st-century American businesspeople
21st-century American writers
American hip hop record producers
American music publishers (people)
East Coast hip hop musicians
Businesspeople from New York City
Songwriters from New York (state)
Writers from New York City
Record producers from New York (state)